The Germantown White House (also known as the Deshler–Morris House) is a historic mansion in the Germantown section of Philadelphia, Pennsylvania. It is the oldest surviving presidential residence, having twice housed Founding Father George Washington during his presidency.

Construction and ownership
The house's alternate name comes from its first and last owners: David Deshler, who built it beginning in 1752; and Elliston P. Morris, who donated it to the National Park Service in 1948.

Deshler, a merchant, bought a  lot from George and Anna Bringhurst in 1751–52, and constructed a four-room summer cottage. Twenty years later he built a 3-story, 9-room addition to the front, creating one of the most elegant homes in the region.

Isaac Franks, a former colonel in the Continental Army, bought the house following Deshler's 1792 death. It was he who rented it to President Washington.

Later, the house was sold to Elliston and John Perot, and in 1834 to Elliston's son-in-law, Samuel B. Morris. The Morris family lived in the house for over a hundred years, before its 1948 donation to the National Park Service.

History

Revolutionary War
On October 4, 1777, it was a scene of fighting in the Battle of Germantown, after which British General Sir William Howe occupied the house.

1793
When the Yellow Fever Epidemic of 1793 struck Philadelphia, President Washington remained in the city until September, before making his regular autumn trip home to Mount Vernon. He and a small group of slaves returned in early November, but Philadelphia was under quarantine and they were rerouted to Germantown, then  outside the city.

He first occupied the Dove House, the headmaster's residence for Germantown Academy (now extensively altered and part of Pennsylvania School for the Deaf).

Returning to Germantown, from November 16 to 30, he occupied the Isaac Franks house. His wife Martha, two of her grandchildren, Eleanor Parke Custis and George Washington Parke Custis, and more of their slaves and staff joined him late in the stay.

1794
The following September and October, Washington and his family returned to the Franks house for vacation, although he left early to deal with the Whiskey Rebellion in Western Pennsylvania. He met there four times with his cabinet: Secretary of State Thomas Jefferson, Secretary of Treasury Alexander Hamilton, Attorney General Edmund Randolph, and Secretary of War Henry Knox. The President posed for painter Gilbert Stuart, who kept a studio nearby, and the family attended the German Reformed Church across the square.

Four slaves were held by the Washingtons at the Franks house: Oney Judge, Austin (her brother), Moll, and Hercules.

Preservation

The house is administered by Independence National Historical Park. In 1972, the house was listed on the National Register of Historic Places. The house is also a contributing property of the Colonial Germantown Historic District. In 2009, the National Park Service changed the official name of the house from the "Deshler-Morris House" to the "Germantown White House."

Bringhurst House
The Bringhurst House, neighboring the Germantown White House on the northwest, was originally owned by John Bringhurst (February 19, 1725 – March 18, 1795), a carriage builder and inventor of the Germantown Wagon; in 1780 he built a carriage for George Washington. Today, near the current historic site, Bringhurst Street is a street named after him which lies on the edge of his former land.

Lieutenant Colonel John Bird was lying sick in the Bringhurst House when the American army attacked on the morning of October 4, 1777. Bird arose from bed to lead his men, but was mortally wounded in the battle. Although a surgeon tried to treat him in Melchoir Meng's house situated on what is now a part of Vernon Park, he was carried back to the Bringhurst House, where he died.

In 1973, the Bringhurst house was donated to the National Park Service from the Germantown Savings Bank in order to "assure access, light, and air for the historic structure". The Bringhurst property is currently in the process of conversion into an exhibition space and welcome center for the Germantown White House landscape.

See also

 President's House (Philadelphia), Washington's executive mansion, 1790–1797
 List of residences of presidents of the United States
 Oney Judge, enslaved maid of Martha Washington
 Hercules (chef), enslaved cook for Washington's presidential household
 Tobias Lear V, Washington's secretary
 Wyck House

References

Further reading
 Minardi, Joseph M. Historic Architecture in Northwest Philadelphia: 1690–1930s. Atglen, PA: Schiffer Publishing, 2011.
 Marion, John Francis, Bicentennial City: Walking Tours of Historic Philadelphia. Princeton: The Pyne Press, 1974.
 Jenkins, Charles F., The Guide Book to Historic Germantown. Germantown Historical Society, 1973.
 Jenkins, Charles F., Washington in Germantown. Philadelphia: Canterbury Press, 1905.
 "Deshler–Morris House." National Park Service brochure. Independence National Historical Park.

External links
Germantown White House at the National Park Service
Article at UShistory.org

Independence National Historical Park
Houses on the National Register of Historic Places in Philadelphia
Historic American Buildings Survey in Philadelphia
Historic house museums in Philadelphia
American Revolutionary War museums in Pennsylvania
Houses completed in 1772
Presidential residences in the United States
Historic district contributing properties in Pennsylvania
1772 establishments in Pennsylvania
Germantown, Philadelphia
Philadelphia in the American Revolution
Deshler
Historic House Museums of the Pennsylvania Germans
Homes of United States Founding Fathers